CHIP-8 is an interpreted programming language, developed by Joseph Weisbecker made on his 1802 Microprocessor. It was initially used on the COSMAC VIP and Telmac 1800 8-bit microcomputers in the mid-1970s. CHIP-8 programs are run on a CHIP-8 virtual machine. It was made to allow video games to be more easily programmed for these computers. The simplicity of CHIP-8, and its long history and popularity, has ensured that CHIP-8 emulators and programs are still being made to this day.

Roughly fifteen years after CHIP-8 was introduced, derived interpreters appeared for some models of graphing calculators (from the late 1980s onward, these handheld devices in many ways have more computing power than most mid-1970s microcomputers for hobbyists).

An active community of users and developers existed in the late 1970s, beginning with ARESCO's "VIPer" newsletter whose first three issues revealed the machine code behind the CHIP-8 interpreter.

CHIP-8 applications

There are a number of classic video games ported to CHIP-8, such as Pong, Space Invaders, Tetris, and Pac-Man. There are also applications like a random maze generator and Conway's Game of Life.

CHIP-8 extensions and variations

During the 1970s and 1980s, CHIP-8 users shared CHIP-8 programs, but also changes and extensions to the CHIP-8 interpreter, in the COSMAC VIP users' newsletter, VIPER magazine. These extensions included CHIP-10 and Hi-Res CHIP-8, which introduced a higher resolution than the standard 64x32, and CHIP-8C and CHIP-8X, which extended the monochrome display capabilities to support limited color, among other features. These extensions were mostly backwards compatible, as they were based on the original interpreter, although some repurposed rarely used opcodes for new instructions.

In 1979, Electronics Australia ran a series of articles on building a kit computer similar to the COSMAC VIP, based on the Motorola 6800 architecture. This computer, the DREAM 6800, came with its own version of CHIP-8. A newsletter similar to VIPER, called DREAMER, was used to share CHIP-8 games for this interpreter. In 1981, Electronics Today International (ETI) ran a series of articles on building a computer, the ETI-660, which also was very similar to the VIP (and used the same microprocessor). ETI ran regular ETI-660 and general CHIP-8 columns until 1985.

In 1990, a CHIP-8 interpreter called CHIP-48 was made for HP-48 graphing calculators so games could be programmed more easily. Erik Bryntse later created another interpreter based on CHIP-48, called SCHIP, S-CHIP or Super-Chip. SCHIP extended the CHIP-8 language with a larger resolution and several additional opcodes meant to make programming easier. If it were not for the development of the CHIP-48 interpreter, CHIP-8 would not be as well known today.

David Winter's emulator, disassembler, and extended technical documentation popularized CHIP-8/SCHIP on many other platforms. It laid out a complete list of undocumented opcodes and features, and was distributed across many hobbyist forums. Many emulators used these works as a starting point.

However, CHIP-48 subtly changed the semantics of a few of the opcodes, and SCHIP continued to use those new semantics in addition to changing other opcodes. Many online resources about CHIP-8 propagate these new semantics, so many modern CHIP-8 games are not backwards compatible with the original CHIP-8 interpreter for the COSMAC VIP, even if they do not specifically use the new SCHIP extensions.

CHIP-8 today

There is a CHIP-8 implementation for almost every platform, as well as some development tools. Games are still being developed and cataloged for CHIP-8 today, in addition to older games resurfacing online in digital archives.

While CHIP-8 and SCHIP have commonly been implemented as emulators, a pure hardware implementation (written in the Verilog language) also exists for certain FPGA boards.

Virtual machine description

Memory

CHIP-8 was most commonly implemented on 4K systems, such as the Cosmac VIP and the Telmac 1800.  These machines had 4096 (0x1000) memory locations, all of which are 8 bits (a byte) which is where the term CHIP-8 originated.  However, the CHIP-8 interpreter itself occupies the first 512 bytes of the memory space on these machines.  For this reason, most programs written for the original system begin at memory location 512 (0x200) and do not access any of the memory below the location 512 (0x200).  The uppermost 256 bytes (0xF00-0xFFF) are reserved for display refresh, and the 96 bytes below that (0xEA0-0xEFF) were reserved for the call stack, internal use, and other variables.

In modern CHIP-8 implementations, where the interpreter is running natively outside the 4K memory space, there is no need to avoid the lower 512 bytes of memory (0x000-0x1FF), and it is common to store font data there.

Registers

CHIP-8 has 16 8-bit data registers named V0 to VF. The VF register doubles as a flag for some instructions; thus, it should be avoided. In an addition operation, VF is the carry flag, while in subtraction, it is the "no borrow" flag. In the draw instruction VF is set upon pixel collision.

The address register, which is named I, is 12 bits wide and is used with several opcodes that involve memory operations.

The stack

The stack is only used to store return addresses when subroutines are called. The original RCA 1802 version allocated 48 bytes for up to 12 levels of nesting; modern implementations usually have more.

Timers

CHIP-8 has two timers. They both count down at 60 hertz, until they reach 0.

Delay timer: This timer is intended to be used for timing the events of games. Its value can be set and read.
Sound timer: This timer is used for sound effects. When its value is nonzero, a beeping sound is made.

Input

Input is done with a hex keyboard that has 16 keys ranging 0 to F. The '8', '4', '6', and '2' keys are typically used for directional input. Three opcodes are used to detect input. One skips an instruction if a specific key is pressed, while another does the same if a specific key is not pressed. The third waits for a key press, and then stores it in one of the data registers.

Graphics and sound

Original CHIP-8 Display resolution is 64×32 pixels, and color is monochrome. Graphics are drawn to the screen solely by drawing sprites, which are 8 pixels wide and may be from 1 to 15 pixels in height. Sprite pixels are XOR'd with corresponding screen pixels. In other words, sprite pixels that are set flip the color of the corresponding screen pixel, while unset sprite pixels do nothing. The carry flag (VF) is set to 1 if any screen pixels are flipped from set to unset when a sprite is drawn and set to 0 otherwise. This is used for collision detection.

As previously described, a beeping sound is played when the value of the sound timer is nonzero.

Opcode table

CHIP-8 has 35 opcodes, which are all two bytes long and stored big-endian. The opcodes are listed below, in hexadecimal and with the following symbols:

NNN: address
NN: 8-bit constant
N: 4-bit constant
X and Y: 4-bit register identifier
PC : Program Counter
I : 16bit register (For memory address) (Similar to void pointer);
VN: One of the 16 available variables. N may be 0 to F (hexadecimal);

There have been many implementations of the CHIP-8 instruction set since 1978. The following specification is based on the SUPER-CHIP specification from 1991 (but without the additional opcodes that provide extended functionality), as that is the most commonly encountered extension set today. Footnotes denote incompatibilities with the original CHIP-8 instruction set from 1978.

Notes

References

Further reading
 "RCA COSMAC VIP CDP18S711 Instruction Manual," RCA Solid State Division, Somerville, NJ 08776, February 1978. Part VIP-311. pp. 13–18, 35–37.
 BYTE magazine, December 1978, pp. 108–122. "An Easy Programming System," by Joseph Weisbecker.  Describes CHIP-8 with specific example of a rocketship and UFO shooting-gallery game.
Archive of Chip8.com Website dedicated to CHIP-8 and related systems. Maintains the most complete collection of CHIP-8 programs on the net.
Mastering CHIP-8, an accurate reference to the original CHIP-8 instruction set
David Winter's CHIP-8 Emulator, utilities and games.
BytePusher A minimalist virtual machine inspired by the CHIP-8.
RCA COSMAC group on Yahoo, with authorized scans of the VIPER magazine.
OChip8  A CHIP-8 emulator in a browser
Dream 6800 The popular Dream 6800 Microcomputer featured in Electronics Australia in 1979 ran CHIP-8.
FPGA SuperChip A Verilog implementation of the SCHIP specification.
 Octo is an Online CHIP-8 IDE, Development System, Compiler/Assembler and Emulator, with a proprietary scripting language
Cowgod's Chip-8 Technical Reference (CHIP-48/SCHIP)
Matt Mikolay CHIP-8 Extensions Reference
CHIP-8.com CHIP-8 Classic Computer Manual

Virtual machines
Virtualization software
CHIP-8
Graphing calculator software